Georgy Pavlovich Pashkov (1886–1925) was a Russian artist known for his work in interior design, painting and graphics. He designed the first postage stamps of the Soviet Union in 1923.

Biography 
Georgy Pashkov was born in 1886. The Pashkov family, a family of iconographers in Moscow, had a high reputation for decades and had the patronage of the Imperial family.

Georgy Pashkov and his brothers Pavel and Nikolai graduated from the Stroganov Art School and became successful Moscow artists. They were appreciated as decorators. The Pashkov brothers participated in a number of important decorating projects supported by the Russian Royal Family. In 1912, Georgy Pashkov with his brother Nikolai decorated the lower church of the Feodorovsky Imperial Cathedral in Tsarskoye Selo. In 1914, they also painted frescos in the Church of the Icon of the Mother of God Joy to All the Afflicted for the Community of the Sisters of Charity of the Red Cross in Tsarskoye Selo. For this work, they received the honorary title of Court Artists.

Another field of the Pashkovs' artistic activity was commercial advertising. In particular, Georgy Pashkov created a significant number of advertising posters in the pre-World War I times.

Postage stamps 

In 1923, Georgy Pashkov created the design of the first USSR stamps (First All-Russia Agricultural Exhibition issue).

See also 
 First USSR stamps

References

External links 
 

1886 births
1925 deaths
Artists from the Russian Empire
Russian icon painters
20th-century Russian painters
Russian male painters
Russian graphic designers
Russian stamp designers
Postage stamps of the Soviet Union
20th-century Russian male artists
Stroganov Moscow State Academy of Arts and Industry alumni